Cyclophora argyromyces is a moth in the family Geometridae first described by Louis Beethoven Prout in 1938. It is found in Colombia.

References

Moths described in 1938
Cyclophora (moth)
Moths of South America